Stigmella altella is a moth of the family Nepticulidae. It is found in Ohio and Maine in the United States.

The wingspan is 5.6-6.4 mm. There is one generation per year in Ohio, with mines being collected in October and adults emerging the following May and early June.

The larvae feed on Quercus imbricaria and Quercus palustris. They mine the leaves of their host plant. The mine is much contorted, linear and located on the lower surface of the leaf. It barely visible from the upper side. The frass is scattered across the entire width of the mine.

External links
Nepticulidae of North America
A taxonomic revision of the North American species of Stigmella (Lepidoptera: Nepticulidae)

Nepticulidae
Moths of North America
Moths described in 1914